is an arcade game released by Konami in August 1993. It is one of Konami's last side-scrolling Beat 'em up games to appear in the arcades along Violent Storm.

The game mechanics are similar to those of Konami's earlier arcade hit, X-Men, and runs on the same hardware as their ninja-themed game, Mystic Warriors.

Plot
The Evil King Death Shadow, ruler of the Empire of Horror, has arisen from the dead to rule the world once more. The Greek goddess Athena has summoned the souls of four ancient guardians and bestowed their power upon four heroes to stop the evil once again. These guardians wield the ability to morph into anthropomorphic beasts to fight their enemies.

Protagonists
Ban (蛮), a martial artist. His guardian soul is a Fighting Bull, hence his beast form is a Minotaur.

Claude, a swordsman who wields a rapier. His guardian soul is a White Wolf, and he transforms into a White Werewolf.

Max, a fighter with a boxing style. His guardian soul is a Black Panther, and so his beast form is a Werepanther.

Ivan (Иван), a  hunter and wrestler who fights with a small log. His guardian soul is a Bear, so he transforms into a Werebear.

Gameplay

The game's four main characters are able to morph into anthropomorphic "beasts" (referred to as Beast Mode) by collecting a Golden Statue power-up which drops from either a random chest that falls from the sky, or through an anthropomorphic rodent appearing at random times and supplying the player with either a Health Item, Score Item, or Gold Statue. The rodent will drop power-ups after a certain period of time, or if the player attacks him, similar to the elves in Golden Axe. When the players collect a Statue when already in Beast Mode, the character performs a "Screen Attack" destroying all on-screen enemies (if the Statue is collected during a boss fight, the boss is hit hard and usually twice).

The enemies are also anthropomorphic creatures such as frogmen, elephant men, lizardmen, hedgehog men, boar men, and others; and include bosses such as Cabrios the Ram-Man (similar to the pagan god Baphomet) armed with a Scythe, a Flaming Chicken-Man who wields a Sword, an Amazon Demoness, and the Dark Dragon. At the end of Stages 2 and 4, players enter a bonus stage (destroy a statue or a string of regular enemies) which awards them extra points and health.

Differences between the US and Japanese versions
The US version of Metamorphic Force uses a numeric lifepoint counter that doubles as the timer, going down by one lifepoint each tick (much like in ‘’Gauntlet’’), while the Japanese version uses a  traditional health bar. The Fifth Stage in the US version consists of a boss rush where the player fights the previous bosses in pairs before facing the level's own boss, while in the Japanese version the player fights that level boss only. In addition, some sprites have been completely altered, such as the stained glass artwork seen during the elevator scene in the Final Stage.

Reception 
In Japan, Game Machine listed Metamorphic Force on their September 15, 1993 issue as being the seventeenth most-successful table arcade unit of the month. In North America, RePlay reported that Metamorphic Force was the nineteenth most-popular arcade game in December 1993, and Play Meter listed Metamorphic Force to be the 54th most-popular arcade game in January 1994. In Europe, the game was selling well through January 1994.

Legacy
 The complete soundtrack to Metamorphic Force is featured in the 2-disc CD album Konami Amusement Sounds '93: Autumn Edition, published on October 21, 1993 and distributed by King Records. Disc 2 contains all the tracks from the game.

 Model DD6 and Model DD7 of Konami's Bemani games originate from this game. Model DD6 is used on Stages 2 and 7's boss battles while Model DD7 is used specifically on Stage 5's boss battle.

See also
 Therianthropy

References

1993 video games
Arcade video games
Arcade-only video games
Cooperative video games
Konami beat 'em ups
Side-scrolling beat 'em ups
Video games based on Greek mythology
Video games developed in Japan
Video games about shapeshifting